The Immortals of rugby league in Australia are players named as the nation's greatest ever. From 1981 to 2017 The Immortals were named by the Australian sports magazine Rugby League Week. From 2018, the National Rugby League took over The Immortals concept.

Established in 1981, the original group consisted of former Test captains Clive Churchill, Bob Fulton, Reg Gasnier, and Johnny Raper. Although Rugby League Week (RLW) did not hold any official affiliation with any of the governing bodies of rugby league in Australia, the release was met with much public respect and admiration for the players listed. To coincide with this announcement, Hunter Valley vineyard Elliots Wines released, in conjunction with Rugby League Week, four bottles of 1977 vintage port as a boxed set. Each player was represented on the label of each of the bottles. Returning eighteen years later, Rugby League Week announced in 1999 its intention to select a fifth member of The Immortals. However, the panel of experts chosen to pick the next Immortal was unable to decide on a sole player; it was then announced that the next additions to The Immortals would be Graeme Langlands and Wally Lewis. 2003 saw the addition of Arthur Beetson as the seventh Immortal.

Andrew Johns was inducted as the eighth Immortal at the Men of League Gala Dinner the week of the 2012 NRL Grand Final. The judges who deliberated over candidates were: Wayne Bennett (seven-time premiership winning coach, former Queensland Origin coach), Ray Warren (Channel Nine network television senior commentator), John Grant (Chairman ARL Commission), David Middleton (leading rugby league historian), Ray Hadley (radio and Channel Nine network television commentator), Phil Rothfield (News Limited), Roy Masters (journalist, Fairfax Media), Geoff Prenter (RLW Founding Editor 1970-81), Ian Heads (RLW Editor 1981-87), Norman Tasker (RLW Editor 1988-2000), Tony Durkin (RLW Editor 2001-02), Martin Lenehan (RLW Editor 2003-11) and Mitchell Dale (RLW Editor). The current living Immortals (Fulton, Raper, Langlands, Lewis and Johns) were also granted a vote. Fulton, Raper and Langlands have since died.

Although the tag of Immortal continues to be a highly respected one for any player to obtain, it was initially criticised for only being awarded to post-war players. However, it was agreed by the first judges in 1981 (Frank Hyde, Harry Bath and Tom Goodman), that they could only judge on players they had seen in action. Furthermore, to overcome entrenched criticism over Johns' admitted use of recreational drugs during his playing career, the rules were altered so the candidates can only be judged on their playing ability alone, and nothing else.

With the closure of Rugby League Week in 2017, the concept was taken over by the Australian Rugby League Commission.

On 1 August 2018, a further five players were announced as Immortals, bringing the tally to thirteen. They were Dave Brown, Frank Burge, Mal Meninga, Dally Messenger, and Norm Provan. It was the first time that the three pre-World War II champions could be considered for this recognition, as it had previously been an award restricted to post-World War II players.

Eligibility Criteria: To be eligible to be considered, the player must be a member of the National Rugby League Hall of Fame.

Living Immortals 
There are three living Immortals: Andrew Johns (age ), Wally Lewis and Mal Meninga. The last Immortal to die was Johnny Raper, on 9 February 2022.

References

Rugby league trophies and awards